is a city located in Miyazaki Prefecture, Japan. As of June 1, 2019, the city has an estimated population of 29,262 and a population density of 66.7 persons per km2. The total area is 438.79 km2.

The agricultural products of Saito include green peppers, cucumbers and sweet corn. And the Saito is famous for its eel from Hokita and the Saito Baru Burial Mounds.

Geography
Saito is the 5th largest city in the Miyazaki prefecture.  70% of the city is mountainous, and a river cuts through the city from northwest to southeast.  Many other smaller streams cut through the valleys in Saito.  Much of the city is covered by mountains and forest (approximately 80%). It is bordered by Kijo Town, Takanabe Town, Shintomi Town in the East and Sadowara Town and Kunitomi Town in the South, and Nango Village and  Village in the north.
Mountains: , 
Rivers: , 
Lakes and Marshes: , 
Dams:

Climate
Saito has a humid subtropical climate (Köppen climate classification Cfa) with hot, humid summers and cool winters.

Demographics
Per Japanese census data, the population of Saito in 2020 is 28,610 people. Saito has been conducting censuses since 1920.

Culture

Mythology

The Kojiki is an ancient manuscript which tells many creation and origin stories which attribute to different traditions and in Saito.

The myth of the all night Kagura dance in Shiromi goes thus: When Amatsuhiko-Hiko-Hononinigi-no-Mikoto (Hononinigi) descended from heaven onto the peak of Mt. Takachiho in a place called Himuka of Tsukushi, with him came many servants and gifts received from the sun god Amaterasu, among the gifts were a sickle, a sword and a mirror.

When he met Konohana-no-Sakuya-Bime (Tree-Blossom-Blooming-Princess), a beautiful princess he asked her father for her hand in marriage and her father agreed sending with her many gifts and her sister Ihanaga-Hime (Eternal-Rock-Princess), Ihanaga-Hime's father wanted to endow Hononinigi's children with long life like that of a rock.

However Hononinigi found Ihanaga-Hime so ugly he sent her back to her father and then proceeded to consummate his marriage with Konohana-no-Sakuya-Bime, which was the first marriage between a deity of earth with one of heaven.  On returning home Ihanaga-Hime bemoaning her misfortune threw away a mirror reflecting her own image in its glass, the mirror fell in Shiromi. So the Shiromi shrine is dedicated to Ihanaga-Hime.

Festivals and Traditions
Saito City Flower Festival
Date: 31 March ~ 8 April
Time: 10am - 10pm daily
Location: Saitobaru

The Flower Festival is a chance to enjoy Saitobaru's 2000 sakura trees as they flower for the short time at the end of March and beginning of April.

'Kofun Matsuri'
Date: 27th - 29 August
Time: 10am -10pm daily
Location: Saitobaru

Summer matsuri (festivals) are a regular occurrence and popular summer event all over Japan.

Tourism

Places of interest
There are many places of interest in Saito.  These include shrines, temples, museums and buildings of architectural or historical interest.  Saito is perhaps most famous for Saitobaru which is a National Special Historic site and historical research site.  Other notable places include Saito's Sports Center, Concert Hall and Irifune Eel Restaurant.

Saitobaru

Saitobaru kofungun is a collection of 9 clusters of tumuli comprising 311 burial mounds which lay on a plateau roughly 4 by 2 km in size, making it one of the largest collections of burial mounds in Japan. It was designated a Special Historic site by the Japanese government in 1952.

 Tsuma Temple
 Yamajibishamonten
 Tonokōri Castle - A castle ruin, Home castle of Itō clan
 Sugiyasu

Education

Local Schools
Elementary Schools

 Tsumakita elementary 妻北小学校
 Tsumaminami elementary 妻南小学校
 Sanzai elementary 三財小学校
 Minoh elementary 三納小学校
 Yamada bunko elementary 山田分校
 Chausubaru elementary 茶臼原小学校
 Shirokami elementary 銀上小学校
 Tonokouri elementary 都於郡小学校
 Hokita elementary　穂北小学校

Junior High Schools

 Tsuma JHS 妻中学校
 Sanzai JHS 三財中学校
 Minoh JHS 三納中学校
 Shiromi JHS 銀鏡中学校
 Hokita JHS　穂北中学校
 Tonokouri JHS　都於郡中学校

High Schools

 Tsuma High School 妻高校
 Saito Commercial High School 西都商業高校

Colleges

History

Translated from the Saito Homepage

Mayors of Saito City

Notable People
 Toshiro Konishi, Japanese Peruvian chef, musician and television personality

References

External links

 Saito City official website 
 Saito City information 
 Pictures Pictures of places and events in Saito
 Saito Burial Mounds in Japanese and English
 

Cities in Miyazaki Prefecture